Charles Robert Munro (22 May 1917, in Christchurch – 9 December 1985, in Sydney) was a jazz reedist and flautist born in New Zealand but based chiefly out of Australia.

Munro moved to Sydney when he was 21, and played in the bands of Myer Norman and Wally Parks in addition to work as a sideman on various nightclub, theater, and ship gigs. He served in the military during World War II, then worked with Wally Norman at the Roosevelt nightclub in Sydney. He played with Bob Gibson in 1950, then joined the Australian Broadcasting Commission's dance band in 1954, continuing to work with the group through 1976 as a composer, performer, and arranger. He worked extensively with Bryce Rohde in the 1960s, participating in many of Rohde's Australian jazz experiments. He led his own bands toward the end of his career, and also worked with Georgina de Leon.

Discography as leader
Eastern Horizons (1967)
Count Down (1969)
Integrations (1981)

References
Bruce Johnson/Roger T. Dean, "Charlie Munro". Grove Jazz online.

Further reading
Andrew Bisset: Black Roots, White Flowers: a History of Jazz in Australia  (1979; revised 1987)
B. Johnson: The Oxford Companion to Australian Jazz (1987)
J. Clare: Bodgie Dada and the Cult of Cool (1995) 
W. Bebbington: The Oxford Companion to Australian Music (1997) 
J. Whiteoak: Playing ad lib: Improvisatory Music in Australia, 1836–1970 (1999)

1917 births
1985 deaths
Australian jazz flautists
New Zealand emigrants to Australia
20th-century Australian musicians
20th-century flautists